The Archer County Courthouse and Jail is a historic courthouse building on Public Square and Sycamore and Pecan Streets in Archer City, Texas.

Archer County was organized in 1880. The Romanesque style courthouse was built during 1891-92 and replaced a wooden courthouse from 1880.  An architectural design competition was held, and the Romanesque Revival-style design of architect Alonzo N. Dawson of Fort Worth was chosen out of 25 submissions.

The contract amount for construction was $32,500. The exterior walls of the courthouse are of brown sandstone obtained from a nearby quarry. Originally, the building was two-story and rising from the center of the courthouse was a massive octagonal tower, with four clock faces, terminated with a cupola. The tower was removed in 1928 and a third floor was added.

The jail, a block north of the courthouse, was built in 1910.

The courthouse and jail were added to the National Register of Historic Places in 1977.

See also

National Register of Historic Places listings in Archer County, Texas
Recorded Texas Historic Landmarks in Archer County
List of county courthouses in Texas

References

External links

Courthouses on the National Register of Historic Places in Texas
Government buildings completed in 1891
Buildings and structures in Archer County, Texas
Jails on the National Register of Historic Places in Texas
National Register of Historic Places in Archer County, Texas
Jails in Texas
Texas State Antiquities Landmarks
Recorded Texas Historic Landmarks